Stephenson Harwood LLP is a law firm with over 1,300 people worldwide, including more than 190 partners. Headquartered in London, United Kingdom, with eight offices across Asia, Europe and the Middle East. In 2020/21 it achieved total revenues of £209 million and profits per equity partner of £685,000 (2020/21)

History

When attorney William Harwood returned to London after practising in China, he and Henry Stephenson created the firm of Harwood & Stephenson in 1875. The firm's history can be traced back to 1828 and the City law firm Tatham & Lousada. In 1920 Tathams merged with Stephenson Harwood – as the firm was by then known – to form Stephenson Harwood & Tatham, renamed Stephenson Harwood in 1977.

Two years later as one of the first UK firms to enter the Asian market, it has now been in Hong Kong for over forty years. In 2002 the merger with City shipping specialist Sinclair Roche & Temperley gave it a Shanghai office.

Stephenson Harwood played an instrumental role securing release of American hostages during the 1979 Iranian hostage crisis. Acting for Bank Markazi, a leading Iranian financial institution, their personnel became de facto mediators between Iran and America. At the time all foreign Iranian assets, including those of Bank Markazi, were frozen. A key factor delaying release of the hostages was the unfreezing of Iranian assets. Stephenson Harwood engineered the means by which this could be done, causing US Secretary of State, Cyrus Vance to laud the firm.

In 2011, in the largest Boeing deal in aviation history, the firm advised Lion Air on purchasing 230 model 747 aircraft worth US$21.7 billion. The signing was witnessed by the American Chief Executive.

2012

In March 2012 the firm converted to LLP status.

In December 2012 the firm opened an office in Dubai, its first in the Middle East.

2013

Stephenson Harwood Singapore converts to LLP.

2014
Virtus Law and Stephenson Harwood announce formal law alliance.

Seoul office opens.

2019
Eifion Morris appointed CEO.

Key practice areas

 Commercial, outsourcing and technology
 Competition
 Corporate
 Data protection and information
 Dispute resolution
 Employment, pensions, incentives and immigration
 Environment
 Finance
 Intellectual property
 Marine and international trade
 Private client, trusts and fiduciary services
 Private wealth
 Projects and infrastructure
 Real estate
 Regulation
 Restrucuturing and insolvency
 Tax

References

External links
 

Law firms of the United Kingdom
Law firms established in 1977
1977 establishments in England
British companies disestablished in 1977
Foreign law firms with offices in Hong Kong